The Atik Behram-begova džamija (Mosque of Atik Behram Bey), better known as Šarena džamija (Colourful Mosque), is the oldest mosque in Tuzla, Bosnia and Herzegovina.

Name 
The name of Atik was given to this mosque because it is probably the oldest mosque in Tuzla. It also acquired the name of Behram Bey due to the Behram-begova medresa being placed in front of it, and because the mosque was probably renewed and maintained as part of the same waqf (vakif). Due to the decorated interiors, it is called the Colorful Mosque (Šarena džamija).

Architecture 
The mosque was built on a small hill, the size is 10x10m and dominates the environment. Before the fire of 1871, it was built of clay, with a wooden cupola. After its rebuilding in 1888, it had a dome of solid materials, but this was quickly replaced by a tile roof. On the ground floor there are ten windows made of iron with cross bars. The interior of the mosque is decorated with various furniture. The minbar is built in Arabic style. The minaret consists of several parts, so it is squared from the base to the top of the mosque wall with a narrow roof on three sides. The mosque, as well as the harem itself, is secured by a rock-wall support wall with a concrete slab.

See also
 Islam in Bosnia and Herzegovina
 List of mosques in Bosnia and Herzegovina

References 

Buildings and structures in Tuzla
Mosques in Bosnia and Herzegovina
Ottoman mosques in Bosnia and Herzegovina

Sunni mosques